Ér, Orba, Ferón and Fergna, sons of Éber Finn, were, according to medieval Irish legends and historical traditions, joint High Kings of Ireland for half a year after they killed their cousins Luigne and Laigne, sons of Érimón, in the Battle of Árd Ladrann. They were soon killed by Érimón's son Íriel Fáid in the Battle of Cul Martha in revenge for his brothers. Geoffrey Keating dates their reign to 1269 BC, the Annals of the Four Masters to 1681 BC.

The name Ferón means "blacksmith" or "metal worker".

References

Legendary High Kings of Ireland
Mythological cycle
Familicides
Collective heads of state